Ernst Jennrich (15 November 1911 – 20 March 1954) worked as a gardener with an agricultural/horticultural cooperative in East Germany.   He was a family man with four young sons.   He did not smoke or drink:  he could not even shoot straight.   Overnight on 19/20 June 1953 police arrived to arrest him.   He was able to look in on the room where his four children slept.   Wolfgang, the eldest and Ernst, the second youngest, were awake.   He was given time to reassure them that he had done nothing wrong ("Euer Vater hat nichts Unrechtes getan") before being taken away.   Ernst Jennrich was executed at 4 in the morning on 17 March 1954.   The party leadership had been badly unnerved by the short-lived popular revolt of June 1953.   The authorities needed scapegoats following reports of police deaths.   Jennrich was executed following a direct written instruction to the court from Hilde Benjamin, the Minister of Justice.   On 20 August 1991 the original court verdict was overturned and Ernst Jennrich was (posthumously) rehabilitated by a decision of the district court (Bezirksgericht) in his home city of Magdeburg.

Life

Provenance and early years 
He was the eighth of his parents' nine recorded children. After his eight years of compulsory schooling he embarked on an apprenticeship as a baker, but then switched to gardening, in which he completed his apprenticeship. In 1935 he served a four-week prison sentence for criticising of the government.

Hitler years 
During the Hitler years, between 1933 and 1945, Jennrich was called up to undertake "emergency work".   One of the more high-profile projects on which he worked as a labourer was the construction of the Mittelland Canal.  In 1940 he was conscripted by the Labour Service to work at the Junkers aircraft factory.   In 1942 he was conscripted into the army and sent to serve on the Russian front.  He was badly injured by a shrapnel explosion and, during 1943, released from the army, following which he returned to work at Junkers till 1944, when he was again drafted into the army.   In April 1945, as the war drew to a close, he managed to desert and was almost at once captured by the American forces moving in on Magdeburg.  He spent six weeks as a prisoner of war.   By the time of his release, the American forces were giving way to Soviet military administrators under the terms of a pre-existing understanding between the leaders of the two superpowers.

Soviet occupation zone 
Jennrich had married in 1938, and in July 1945, with a wife and four growing children to support, he launched himself as an independent trader in fruit and vegetables.   In 1949 he was forced to abandon the project, however, because it was unprofitable. 

With the fall of Hitler in May 1945, party political involvement was no longer expressly outlawed in Germany.   Almost immediately Jennrich re-joined the SPD, though there is no indication that he ever became a party activist.   In a contentious development which was, as matters turned out, confined to the Soviet occupation zone, in April 1946 the SPD was merged with (or, it sometimes appeared, into) the Communist Party of Germany.   The resulting "Socialist Unity Party" ("Sozialistische Einheitspartei Deutschlands" / SED) was held out by the leadership and their Moscow backers as a vital bulwark against a return to Naziism.   Many believed that in 1933 it had been bitter divisions on the political left that had opened the way for the Hitler government to take power.   Within the part of Germany under Soviet military administration most members of the former Communist Party and many members of the SPD lost no time in signing their party membership over to the new SED.   The authorities went out of their way to make this very easy.   Within the SED there is no indication that Jennrich ever became a party activist, and more than he had within the SPD between 1945 and 1946.   Nevertheless, in 1947 he brought himself to the attention of the authorities by resigning his party membership all together.   Some time later, called upon to explain this - arguably "courageous" - move, he explained it as his reaction to having been told, when attending a meeting with party officials, that he had acquired his fruit and vegetables business only through the [good offices of]  the party".

After losing his business in 1949 Jennrich undertook a succession of short term jobs until 1 June 1953, when he accepted a position as a gardener with a Magdeburg-based  Landwirtschaftliche Produktionsgenossenschaft (LPG / "agricultural/horticultural cooperative".   Meanwhile, in October 1949 the Soviet occupation zone had been relaunched and rebranded as the Soviet sponsored German Democratic Republic (East Germany) and, following western rejection in May 1952 of Stalin's proposal for German reunification on Stalin's terms, subjected to an intensified programme of wide-ranging and far-reaching "sovietization".

17 June 1953 
The crystallising issue for the East German uprising of 1953 involved recent increases in "work quotas", which became a particular issue for workers in large production units. On 16 June 1953 construction workers in East Berlin started a strike and a march on the headquarters of the East German Trades Union Federation (which was a creature of the government). Strikes and street demonstrators spread across East Berlin and then, within a day, to other major East German cities, including Magdeburg. At around 08.00 on 17 June 1953 Ernst Jennrich grabbed his bicycle and left his place of work, heading for the administrative office  of the LPG for which he worked, in order to collect a documentary permit for timber clearance. While Jennrich was cycling across the city, in another part of the town, along the Kastanienstraße, about 200 workers had gathered, calling on passing citizens to join them for a general strike and street demonstration. They stopped trams and buses in order to encourage fellow workers to interrupt their commute and join the demonstration. By 09.30 the 200 demonstrators had become 2,000, and the numbers kept on growing. By the mid-morning, the city was on strike and the strikers were on the march across Magdeburg. Jennrich was initially bemused, unaware of why there were so many people out on the streets. He would later tell a court, "I simply had no idea how a strike was meant to look, since I’d never been involved in a strike". According to at least one source, as he returned from the LPG office with his timber clearance permit, Jennrich had to dismount from his bicycle because it was no longer safe, nor even possible, to cycle through the crowds. Elsewhere it is reported that as he began to understand "how a strike was meant to look", he presumably joined the flow in demonstrating against price rises for consumers and the imposition of increased production quotas on workers. Along the way he diverted to the furniture factory where his wife was employed, and asked the people he met there if they didn't want to strike with the others.

Later that morning he met up with his eldest son and they returned to the streets.  There were shouts in the crowd that there was about to be a shooting incident at the Magdeburg police headquarters.   With his son and others Jennrich made his way to the main police office, where the gathering crowd was concentrated outside the  detention centre, which was part of the same "justice complex" as the main police office.   The sequence of the events that ensued is not consistently reported.   Following Jennrich's posthumous rehabilitation by a Magdeburg court, it is his own version of events that becomes more persuasive, and which features in most of the more accessible sources.   By the time Jennrich and his son arrived, probably at around mid-day, the guards outside the detention centre had already been disarmed by the crowd.   An adolescent stranger next to him was brandishing a carbine-rifle which Jennrich seized from him.   An alternative version indicates that the reason he was holding the carbine was that it was Jennrich himself who had disarmed a guard outside the detention centre.   Either way, Jennrich then fired two shots, first at the prison wall and then into the air.   He did this in order the empty the weapon and thereby render it harmless.   He discharged the gun harmlessly at the insistence of fellow protesters, and when he had done so he smashed it.   During the course of the disturbance protesters had already broken through the outer gate of the "justice complex".   Inside the complex two policemen and one official of the detested Ministry for State Security (Stasi)were fatally shot.  It was later established to the satisfaction of a court that these killings were committed between 10.00 and 12.00, and so before Jennrich had arrived on the scene.   That version that, if accepted and applied, would clear Jennrich of any involvement in the killings, and it is the version implicitly accepted by the court that posthumously rehabilitated him in 1991.   But in the trial that established his guilt in September 1953, the inconvenient fact that Jennrich (probably) was somewhere else when the killings took place was overlooked or ignored by the judges.

By the time Soviet troops arrived on the scene and a state of emergency had been declared at around 14.00 in the early afternoon, most of the crowd had dispersed.   For some reason Jennrich was still hanging around, however.

Arrest 
A Cold war reality of the times was that there were large numbers of Soviet troops permanently stationed in East Germany (just as there were large numbers of US forces stationed in West Germany.   The  East German uprising broke out on 16 June 1953 in East Berlin, and in East Berlin it was the Soviet military authorities who were already, on 17 June, 1953 taking a lead in the practical business of suppressing it on the streets.   In Magdeburg, Ernst Jennrich was arrested in the night on 19/20 June 1953, and taken away for questioning by a small team of Russian interrogators.   Once they had finished with him he was handed over to the East German authorities who prepared the charges.   The charges, which indicate that surveillance reports in respect of the accused had been received and evaluated over a significant period of time, are as follows:
  "...inciting boycott and murder against democratic institutions and organisations and, since 8 May 1945, endangering the peace of the German people through spreading propaganda in support of fascism:  consistent with this, acting from insidious and base motives, making possible a further crime, being the intentional killing of a human being".

First trial 
Jennrich faced trial on 25 August 1953.   It had been determined that he should be charged with the killing of a police officer called  who had been fatally injured by a gunshot during the fighting at the Sudenburg detention centre, it was alleged, between 10.00 and 12.00.   Witnesses had been prepared appropriately.  A police officer gave a clear account of the sequence of events.   After the main gate to the justice complex had been broken down, demonstrators began to enter through it.   One of them fired into the complex:  the witness fired back, hitting the gunman in his leg. A second of the demonstrators had fired into the complex:  again the witness had fired back, also hitting the second gunman in the leg. Then the witness saw that a window in the outer wall of the building beside the main gate was being smashed and someone was pointing a carbine from outside the justice complex through a hole in broken glass, towards People's Police Sergeant Gaidzik. That was the source of fatal shot. The missing link in the evidence against Jennrich was that this witness never identified the individual with a carbine who had fired it.   The only obvious link to Jennrich was that he had arrived and fired a carbine an hour or so later.

Permitted to address the judge in his own defence, Jennrich delivered an unexpectedly effective speech:
  "...I can only say this:  that I never wished to become a murderer.  And I never committed any murder, because I know for sure that I did not shoot through the window on the right [of the main gate] at any member of the people's police service.  Furthermore I never had any wish to become the tool of these people, the tool of western provocateurs, nor of people who try to exploit the workers.   I am not a person wishing to be exploited."

The court clearly had substantial doubts over witness statements presented to it, and sentenced Jennrich to life imprisonment of 25 August 1952.

Not the correct outcome? 
Just two days later the public prosecutor lodged his appeal:  "The protection of our peace loving state requires the death penalty for the crime committed by the accused".   Under instructions from the East German Supreme Court the judges who had already heard the case on 25 August 1953 and delivered their agreed judgement conducted a further hearing on 6 October 1953 at the end of which they sentenced Jennrich to death.   The entire process lasted only fifteen minutes.   A further consideration of the evidence was deemed unnecessary.   "...the protection of our social order requires that the highest penalty - being the elimination of the accused from our society, the death penalty - be invoked".   The judges evidently felt they had no choice.   Minister of Justice Hilde Benjamin had already shared her view: "We are of the view that for Jennrich the death penalty is appropriate".   Nevertheless, one of the judges involved evidently had a moment of conscience at the obvious inconsistency between the evidence presented and the imposition of the death penalty.   There is a gap on the document in one of the spaces intended for a judicial signature.

In November 1953, from the isolation cell in which he was being held, Jennrich wrote a detailed seven page plea for clemency to President Pieck in which he insisted on his innocence and declared himself ready to accept even the most difficult of working conditions "in order that I can later be accepted as a complete person within the social order of the German Democratic Republic, but there was no clemency to be had.

Execution by guillotine 
Little is known of his final hours. On the morning of 20 March 1954, at approximately 04.00, Ernst Jennrich was executed on the guillotine. The death certificate necessary in order that the physical remains might be lawfully disposed of showed the causes of his death to have been "pneumonia" and  "acute low blood pressure". Many years later it emerged that he had written a farewell letter for his wife and sons, in which he continued to protest his innocence. Belatedly, the letter has found its way into the possession of one of his younger sons, called, like his father, Ernst Jennrich.

His ashes were placed in an urn and interred near the execution facility at the  Crematorium in Dresden, where they remained till after reunification.

Posthumous rehabilitation 
Following a successful application by one of his sons, Ernst Jennrich jr., the "4th Criminal Senate" at the Halle District Court overturned the 1954 verdict on 20 August 1991.   Ernst Jennrich was acquitted retrospecitively.   The opening up of East German archives from the courts and state justice officials after October 1991 had triggered a major wave of research on the 1953 uprising by respected academics such as, most notably Karl Wilhelm Fricke, and others.   The "4th Criminal Senate" studied the 1953 and 1954 court reports and determined that Jennrich's 1954 conviction and sentencing had been unconstitutional even on the basis of the 1949  East German constitution, which was the constitution on which the 1954 court process and decision was deemed to have been based.   In 1954 the Magdeburg court had focused on Article 6 of the constitution which included what amounted to a definition of the "Boykotthetze" (incitement to boycott) crime.   The 1991 Halle court determined that Article 6 failed to define a crime except in the most generalised of terms:  the crime of incitement to boycott is a crime within the meaning of the penal code".   Furthermore, the 1991 hearing accepted the overwhelming evidence that the death sentence imposed in 1954 had resulted from a decision by the Halle court to treat an instruction to the chairman of the judges from the Minister of Justice as binding.   That represented a serious violation of the law - even the law applicable in East Germany in the aftermath of the 1953 uprising - on the part of the judges involved in the 1954 sentencing.   The judges at the 1991 appeal hearing were also unanimous in supporting the  retrospective acquittal with their opinion that Jennrich's participation in the uprising on 17 June 1953 had been a legitimate "exercise of political opposition and - in essence - an instance of non-violent resistance".   These had been contitutional rights, and not some compouding factor in the court deliberations conducted in Magfeburg in 1953 and 1954.

Notes

References 

Socialist Unity Party of Germany members
German gardeners
People executed by East Germany by guillotine
Executed East German people
Protest-related deaths
East Germany–Soviet Union relations
1911 births
1954 deaths
People from Magdeburg